The budget of France, setting revenues and spending levels is set after approval of the national assembly and the senate. The French Constitution provides for a maximum of 70 days between the budget being proposed to parliament and it being approved. Article 40 of the Constitution stops the National Assembly  and Senate from making any amendments to the total spending and revenue amounts proposed by the government.

Once approved by parliament, the government may make adjustments of up to 2% to the budget without having to seek further parliamentary approval.

In 2011, the government introduced a bill to amend article 34 of the Constitution to ensure a balanced budget.

The French budget concerns only spending and revenue by central government. It thus excludes the Social Security budget and regional and local authorities budgets.

Public spending in 2013

See also
 Decentralisation in France
 Taxation in France

References

Budget
Finance in France
France